Lady of Itzan (7th-century) was a queen of Dos Pilas.

Biography 
She was born in Itzan. She married Bʼalaj Chan Kʼawiil, the king of Dos Pilas. She was the mother of the kings Itzamnaaj Bʼalam and Itzamnaaj Kʼawiil.

It is possible that her daughter was Wak Chanil Ajaw. It is also possible that she had one more daughter.

Another wife of Bʼalaj Chan Kʼawiil was Lady Buluʼ.

Notes 

Itzan
7th century in Guatemala
Year of birth missing
Year of death missing